Elisabeth R. O'Connell is a curator in the Department of Ancient Egypt and Sudan at the British Museum with responsibility for Roman and Late Antique collections. She is particularly known for her work on late antique Egypt and monastic communities.

Career 
O'Connell completed her BA, MA, and PhD at the University of California, Berkeley in the faculty of Ancient History and Mediterranean Archaeology. Her PhD (awarded in 2007) examined how monastic communities in late antique Egypt re-used funerary architecture. During her PhD, O'Connell was the Kress Fellow in Egyptian Art and Architecture (2005-2006) at the American Research Centre in Egypt and received the Joan B. Gruen Essay Prize (2006) for her work Transforming Monumental Landscapes in Late Antique Egypt, the first year it was awarded. O'Connell also produced two online exhibitions for the Center for the Tebtunis Papyri, part of the Bancroft Library of the University of California, Berkeley entitled Ethnic identity in Graeco-Roman Egypt and Readers and writers in Roman Tebtunis.

In 2007, O'Connell joined the Department of Ancient Egypt and Sudan at the British Museum where she curates the collection of Roman and late antique objects from Egypt. For the British Museum O'Connell has worked at the sites of Elkab and Hagr Edfu in Upper Egypt, publishing the fieldwork reports in a series of articles with Vivian Davies. She has also re-assembled previously unpublished objects collected during early 20th century fieldwork in Egypt for modern publication from the sites of Antinoupolis and Wadi Sarga. O'Connell's work in publishing and synthesising new and old work on late antique Egypt is an important part of a new wave of scholarship on a previously neglected period in Egypt.

O'Connell curated the British Museum exhibition Egypt: Faith After the Pharaohs in 2015-2016, which examined the different faiths in Egypt from the Roman period to the arrival of Islam. The exhibition started with objects from c.30 BC, when Egypt became a province of the Roman Empire after the death of Cleopatra and Mark Antony, and then examined different faiths in Egypt until AD 1171 when the rule of the Islamic Fatimid dynasty ended. The exhibition was described as 'trail-blazing' for its examination of religious history in Egypt.

In 2017-18 O'Connell held a research fellowship from the Empires of Faith project.

Select bibliography 

 with C. Fluck, and G. Helmecke eds Egypt: Faith after the pharaohs (British Museum Press, London, 2015)
 Egypt in the First Millennium AD: Perspectives from new fieldwork. British Museum Publications on Egypt and Sudan 2 (Peeters, Leuven, 2014)
 'Catalogue of British Museum objects from The Egypt Exploration Fund’s 1913/14 excavation at Antinoupolis (Antinoë),' in Antinoupolis II: Scavi e materiali III, ed. R. Pintaudi, 467–504 (Florence: Istituto papirologico “G. Vitelli,” 2014)

External links 
British Museum staff page
Academia profile

References

Employees of the British Museum
Living people
American Egyptologists
Historians of antiquity
American curators
American women curators
University of California, Berkeley alumni
Year of birth missing (living people)
21st-century American women